Irisiri is the third studio album by American singer-songwriter and producer Eartheater. It was released on June 8, 2018 under PAN.

Critical reception
Irisiri was met with "universal acclaim" reviews from critics. At Metacritic, which assigns a weighted average rating out of 100 to reviews from mainstream publications, this release received an average score of 81 based on 7 reviews. Aggregator Album of the Year gave the release a 74 out of 100 based on a critical consensus of 7 reviews.

Giving a review of the released on behalf of Crack Magazine, Gunseli Yalcinyaka said, "Set to a backdrop of organic harp chords and pillowy vocals, Drewchin manipulates her musical landscape with arrhythmic melodies and tripped-out beats which come together to form her unique sound. At times, this record can feel uncomfortable, with its abundance of vocal falsettos and staccato synths, but it is in this discomfort that IRISIRI reveals itself." Bryon Hayes from Exclaim! noted the release has "an evolving, extra-sensory shadow show replete with mutant classical music tropes, fractured electronic viscera, the dying gasps of a forgotten operating system, and an unmatched voice that veers between honey sweetness and contorted glossolalia."

Naming it among the best albums of early 2018, PopMatters reviewer Spyros Statis wrote: "Using a collage of sounds technique, Drewchin has produced an act that is hard to categorize. Electronic compositions meet noise injections, while her chameleonic vocal delivery enhances classical renditions."

Accolades

Track listing

References

2018 albums
PAN (record label) albums
Sound collage albums
Electronic albums by American artists